The 1888 Louisiana hurricane was a major hurricane that caused significant flooding and wind damage to the Mississippi River Delta and the Mississippi Valley in late August 1888. It was the third tropical cyclone and second hurricane of the 1888 Atlantic hurricane season. The cyclone first appeared north-northeast of the Turks and Caicos Islands, but may have formed earlier, undetected. It moved west-northwest, reaching hurricane intensity and making several landfalls in the Bahamas. In the island chain, the hurricane caused some damage to shipping, fruit groves, and fences, but apparently caused no known deaths.

The storm then peaked as the equivalence of a strong Category 3 hurricane before hitting South Florida near present-day Miami Beach. Few people then lived in the area, so damage was mostly minimal, but a large storm surge affected the coast, and areas farther north on the peninsula reported damage to fruit groves, communications wires, and boats. Afterward, the cyclone crossed the thinly populated southern peninsula into the Gulf of Mexico, which it reached as a weaker hurricane. Re-intensifying over the Gulf of Mexico, the hurricane attained a secondary peak intensity of  before hitting Louisiana at that intensity. Areas along the Gulf Coast reported significant, widespread destruction from heavy rains, storm surge, and high tides, especially in Louisiana, where the storm destroyed crops and blew down buildings.

The storm then curved northeast into New England before transitioning into an extratropical low-pressure area. The outer bands of the storm produced gale-force winds in the region and nearby Mid-Atlantic states, downing loose objects such as tree branches, awnings, and wires. Heavy rains washed out transportation networks like roads and railroads, but the worst effects were from a tornado outbreak; several significant tornadoes hit the Mid-Atlantic region, one of which caused 10 of the 12 reported deaths in the outbreak.

Meteorological synopsis

Operationally, the U.S. Signal Corps, responsible for weather forecasting at the time, did not issue updates on the system until August 16, when observations first indicated a low-pressure area off the coast of South Florida. (The precise formative date of the cyclone was not documented in available observations, and may have occurred earlier than officially estimated.) Upon formation, the cyclone moved west-northwest toward The Bahamas—then a British crown colony and overseas territory—and steadily strengthened. As a strong tropical storm, the cyclone made its first landfall on the northern tip of San Salvador Island, then known as Watlings Island until 1925. It first attained hurricane intensity by 12:00 UTC on August 15, exactly 24 hours after formation. Still pursuing a track to the west-northwest, the cyclone made a fourth landfall on the northern portion of Andros Island.

After reaching major hurricane status, the cyclone approached the Gulf Stream off the southeast coast of Florida. About seven hours later, the hurricane struck the coast of South Florida, just north of present-day Miami Beach, at its peak intensity. (The point of landfall was near the present-day site of Upper Eastside in Miami.) The hurricane is one of 15 major hurricanes to have impacted southeast Florida since official records in the Atlantic hurricane database (HURDAT) began in 1851. After striking South Florida—now defined as part of the Miami metropolitan area—the cyclone weakened as it moved inland over the Everglades, passing well to the south of Lake Okeechobee. The storm then passed out into the Gulf of Mexico near present-day Matlacha and Cayo Costa State Park.

After entering the Gulf of Mexico off Southwest Florida, the cyclone began to re-intensify and turn to the west. By 18:00 UTC on August 17, the hurricane regained winds equivalent to those of a modern Category 2 hurricane on the Saffir-Simpson hurricane wind scale. After having traveled west-northwest for its entire lifespan, at this time its path shifted to the west and began to approach the northern U.S. Gulf Coast. As it neared the coast of Louisiana, the hurricane maintained its intensity while gradually turning to the northwest and north-northwest. As it moved inland over the marshes of southern Louisiana, the hurricane turned northward and slowly weakened. By 18:00 UTC on August 20, the cyclone weakened to a strong tropical storm as it neared the town of Greenville in western Mississippi. Its path gradually inclined to the northeast and accelerated over the Mississippi Valley, reaching the Mid-Atlantic region by 00:00 UTC on August 22. The extratropical cyclone was last positioned northeast of Newfoundland and Labrador at 18:00 UTC on August 24.

Preparations and impact
As the hurricane passed through The Bahamas, it damaged fruit trees, crops, and fences, especially on the Abaco Islands, Harbour Island, and New Providence. According to the New York Times, winds in Nassau, on New Providence, shifted from northeast and southwest, lasting about eight hours, but causing only slight damage to nearby shipping.

The hurricane affected few people in South Florida, striking a portion of the coast that was largely unpopulated and devoid of major settlements. Nevertheless, the cyclone produced widespread damage over much of the region, extending as far north as Sebastian. The highest winds on the east coast of Florida occurred at Sebastian Inlet and were estimated to have reached minimal hurricane intensity, from the northeast. The strong winds downed trees and telegraph poles; additionally, many small boats were reportedly pushed ashore, and nearby fruit groves sustained "several thousand dollars" in damage. Although the storm mostly produced minimal damage, it reportedly generated a large storm surge of  "on the beaches near Miami"—one of the highest on record in South Florida. However, little information is available about the circumstances of the storm surge value reported in 1888.

As the hurricane passed into the Gulf of Mexico, high tides and strong winds affected the northern U.S. Gulf Coast, beginning in the Big Bend and the Florida Panhandle. The town of Cedar Key experienced light rain as the storm passed well to its southwest. The town also witnessed peak winds of  that led to reports of yachts capsizing. The Florida Panhandle, closer to the center of the storm, experienced much higher winds and sustained heavier damages. Winds of  affected the town of Pensacola, causing significant damage to property in the area. Farther west, other communities reported even more severe damage due to high tides and storm surge. Some damage occurred along the Mississippi coast as waves washed out some coastal structures and winds prostrated trees. However, the worst damage occurred in the Mississippi River Delta, just to the east of the center, where severe flooding left large sections of countryside underwater. Severe damage occurred to crops in the area, particularly rice and sugarcane: entire rice fields were flooded to a depth of several feet, and much of the sugarcane crop was flattened by strong winds. In the Bayou Teche country, the hurricane blew down numerous outbuildings, unroofed numerous homes, and destroyed some large dwellings and churches. After the storm, growers estimated that 30–60% of the rice crop sustained damage. In many areas at least one-third of the timber was downed.

In the Mid-Atlantic region and southern New England, the storm produced gale-force winds and heavy rainfall, washing out numerous railroad bridges and tracks. The winds blew down awnings, signs, and tree branches. In Delaware and Maryland, the cyclone spawned numerous tornadoes—five of which were "significant" (F2 or greater) on the Fujita scale—that killed at least 12 people. One or more tornadoes may have hit Springfield and Glendale in Montgomery County, Maryland, north of Washington, D.C., destroying a church, a dwelling, and a blacksmith's shop. Winds downed large oak trees, "shattering a car" in the county. One tornado caused a large cannery, two stories tall, to collapse, killing 10 people under mounds of debris near Still Pond, Maryland.

References

Bibliography

L
L
L
L
L
L
1888 in Louisiana
1888 natural disasters
1888 meteorology